Boxing Gloves is a 1929 Our Gang short comedy film directed by Anthony Mack. Produced by Hal Roach and released to theaters by Metro-Goldwyn-Mayer on September 9, 1929, it was the 90th Our Gang short to be released.

Plot
Joe's and Chubby's friendship is tested when their affections for Jean cause the two best friends to fight. At the same time, Farina and Harry have been unsuccessfully trying to go into business as fight promoters, and find in Joe's and Chubby's rivalry the ingredients for a perfect boxing match.

Production notes
Boxing Gloves is a remake of the 1923 silent entry The Champeen. It marks the film debut of Jackie Cooper, who would go on to a successful career both with and after Our Gang.

The third Our Gang sound short, Boxing Gloves was advertised as "all-talking," although much of the film is silent footage without overdubbed sound. It is now the earliest Our Gang entry included in the Little Rascals television syndication package.

Cast

 Norman Chaney as Chubby Chaney
 Joe Cobb as Joe Cobb
 Jean Darling as Jean
 Allen Hoskins as Farina
 Bobby Hutchins as Wheezer
 Mary Ann Jackson as Mary Ann
 Harry Spear as Harry
 Pete the Pup as himself
 Jackie Cooper as First angry spectator/Reporter at fight
 Bobby Mallon as Announcer Graham McCracker
 Andy Shuford as Chubby's trainer
 Donnie Smith as Donnie
 Charlie Hall as Sidewalk diner attendant
 Johnny Aber as Extra
 Godfrey "Duffy" Craig as Extra
 Bill Johnson as Undetermined role
 Billy Schuler as Undetermined role

See also
 Our Gang filmography

References

External links
 
 

1929 films
American black-and-white films
Hal Roach Studios short films
Films directed by Robert A. McGowan
1929 comedy films
Our Gang films
1920s American films